Bill Dalkin (15 November 1921 – 27 November 1988) was an Australian rules footballer who played with Collingwood and Hawthorn in the Victorian Football League (VFL).

Notes

External links 

		
Profile on Collingwood Forever

1988 deaths
1921 births
Australian rules footballers from Victoria (Australia)
Collingwood Football Club players
Hawthorn Football Club players